Pierre Albertini (4 January 1942 – 27 January 2017) was a French judoka. He competed in the men's half-heavyweight event at the 1972 Summer Olympics.

References

External links
 

1942 births
2017 deaths
French male judoka
Olympic judoka of France
Judoka at the 1972 Summer Olympics
Universiade bronze medalists for France
Universiade medalists in judo
Chevaliers of the Légion d'honneur
Medalists at the 1967 Summer Universiade
20th-century French people